Damjan Novaković (born 30 September 1966) is a Slovenian basketball coach and former player. He currently serves as a head coach for the Rogaška of the Slovenian Basketball League and the Adriatic Second League.

Playing career 
Novaković started to play basketball for his hometown team Lokomotiva. Later, he also played for Borac Banja Luka and Široki Brijeg.

In 1991, Novaković moved to Rogaška Slatina, Slovenia. There he played 1st-tyer Slovenian League for the Rogaška Donat MG, Šentjur and Zagorje from Zagorje ob Savi.

Coaching career 
After retiring from basketball as a player in 2005, Novaković became head coach for Šentjur, coaching them for the 2005–06 and 2006–07 season. During 2007–08 season, he coached Pivovarna Laško. For the 2008–09 season, he moved back to Šentjur and coached them until the end of 2012–13 season. 

On 13 July 2013 Novaković was hired to be the head coach of the Rogaška.

National team 
Novaković coached Slovenia men's national under-20 basketball team from 2013 to 2015. He coached them for the 2013, 2014 and 2015 FIBA Europe Under-20 Championship.

References

External links 
 Novakovic Pepi Sport Profile
 ABA League Profile
 Coach Profile at eurobasket.com

1966 births
Living people
Basketball players from Mostar
Bosnia and Herzegovina emigrants to Slovenia
HKK Široki players
KK Borac Banja Luka players
KK Lokomotiva Mostar players
Slovenian men's basketball players
Slovenian basketball coaches
Slovenian people of Bosnia and Herzegovina descent
Yugoslav men's basketball players